Arabella Stewart, Countess of Galloway (26 April 1850 – 18 August 1903), formerly Lady Mary Arabella Arthur Cecil, was the wife of Alan Stewart, 10th Earl of Galloway.

She was the daughter of James Brownlow William Gascoyne-Cecil, 2nd Marquess of Salisbury, and his second wife, the former Lady Mary Catherine Sackville-West. Her older half-brother, Robert Arthur Talbot Gascoyne-Cecil, 3rd Marquess of Salisbury, was prime minister of the United Kingdom from 1886 to 1892 and again from 1895 to 1902.

She married the future earl on 25 January 1872, a year before he succeeded to his father's titles. As Lord Garlies, he was Conservative MP for Wigtownshire, thus representing the same party as his brother-in-law.

There were no children from their marriage. The earl died in 1901, aged 65, and was succeeded in the earldom by his brother Randolph Henry Stewart, 11th Earl of Galloway. A portrait photograph of the countess, taken during the 1870s by John Watkins, is held by London's National Gallery.

The dowager countess had a London house at 17 Upper Grosvenor Street, but died at "Cuffnells", Lyndhurst, Hampshire, of pneumonia, aged 53.

Ancestry

References

1850 births
1903 deaths
Peerage of Scotland
Scottish countesses
Daughters of British marquesses